Łosiniec may refer to the following places in Poland:
Łosiniec, Łuków County in Lublin Voivodeship (east Poland)
Łosiniec, Tomaszów Lubelski County in Lublin Voivodeship (east Poland)
Łosiniec, Podlaskie Voivodeship (north-east Poland)
Łosiniec, Greater Poland Voivodeship (west-central Poland)
Łosiniec, West Pomeranian Voivodeship (north-west Poland)